A Perfect Day is a 2015 Spanish comedy-drama film written and directed by Fernando León de Aranoa. It is based on the novel Dejarse Llover by Paula Farias. It was screened in the Directors' Fortnight section at the 2015 Cannes Film Festival and is the director’s English-language debut.

Plot
Veteran humanitarian aid workers Mambrú (Benicio del Toro) and B (Tim Robbins), and newcomer Sophie (Mélanie Thierry), accompanied by their interpreter Damir (Fedja Štukan), try to retrieve a corpse from a well somewhere in former Yugoslavia at the end of the Yugoslav Wars.

Their first attempt fails because their rope tears, so they set out to find another rope, which turns out to be more difficult than expected. They are joined in their endeavor by Mambrú's former lover Katya (Olga Kurylenko) and a young local boy named Nikola.

Cast
Benicio del Toro as Mambrú
Tim Robbins as B
Olga Kurylenko as Katya
Mélanie Thierry as Sophie
Fedja Štukan as Damir
Eldar Residovic as Nikola
Sergi López as Goyo

Reception
On Rotten Tomatoes, the film holds a 71% approval rating, based on 58 reviews. The consensus reads: "Aid workers get their due in A Perfect Day, which is just different and well-acted enough to overcome its logy pace and narrative clichés". On Metacritic, the film holds a score of 59 out of 100, sampled from 15 critics, indicating "mixed or average reviews".

Manohla Dargis of The New York Times said that, the film is "a serviceable, watchable movie". Lou Lumenick of the New York Post and Henry Barnes of The Guardian compared the film's humor to that of M*A*S*H, while Chris Nashawaty of Entertainment Weekly criticized female characters of Mélanie Thierry and Olga Kurylenko for being "disappointingly thin".

Awards and nominations

Benicio del Toro was presented with the honorary award, Heart of Sarajevo, at the Sarajevo Film Festival.

See also
 List of Spanish films of 2015

References

External links

2015 comedy-drama films
Spanish comedy-drama films
English-language Spanish films
Bosnian War films
Films shot in Spain
Films set in 1995
Films directed by Fernando León de Aranoa
2010s English-language films
2010s Spanish films